, the World Checklist of Selected Plant Families accepts 212 species of Asparagus:

 Asparagus acicularis F.T.Wang & S.C.Chen – S.E. China (to Hubei)
 Asparagus acocksii Jessop – S. Africa
 Asparagus acutifolius L. – Mediterranean
 Asparagus adscendens Roxb. – Pakistan to W. Himalaya
 Asparagus aethiopicus L. – Cape Province to North-West Province
 Asparagus africanus Lam. – Tropical & S. Africa, Arabian Peninsula, W. India
 Asparagus aggregatus (Oberm.) Fellingham & N.L.Mey. – Limpopo
 Asparagus albus L. – W. & Central Mediterranean
 Asparagus alopecurus (Oberm.) Malcomber & Sebsebe – W. Cape Province
 Asparagus altiscandens Engl. & Gilg – S. Tropical Africa
 Asparagus altissimus Munby – N.W. Sahara
 Asparagus angulofractus Iljin – Central Asia to S.W. Xinjiang
 Asparagus angusticladus (Jessop) J.-P.Lebrun & Stork – Tropical & S. Africa
 Asparagus aphyllus L. – Mediterranean to N.W. Arabian Peninsula
 Asparagus arborescens Willd. ex Schult. & Schult.f. – Canary Islands
 Asparagus aridicola Sebsebe – Ethiopia to Kenya
 Asparagus asiaticus L. – India
 Asparagus asparagoides (L.) Druce – S. Ethiopia to S. Africa
 Asparagus aspergillus Jessop – S. Ethiopia to S. Africa
 Asparagus baumii Engl. & Gilg – S. Tropical Africa
 Asparagus bayeri (Oberm.) Fellingham & N.L.Mey. – W. Cape Province
 Asparagus benguellensis Baker – Angola
 Asparagus bequaertii De Wild. – Zaïre
 Asparagus biflorus (Oberm.) Fellingham & N.L.Mey. – KwaZulu-Natal to Swaziland
 Asparagus botschantzevii – Central Asia
 Asparagus botswanicus Sebsebe – N. Botswana
 Asparagus brachiatus Thulin – Somalia
 Asparagus brachyphyllus Turcz. – Central Asia to Korea
 Asparagus breslerianus Schult. & Schult.f. – Caucasus to Mongolia and W. Pakistan
 Asparagus buchananii Baker – S.W. Ethiopia to S. Africa
 Asparagus bucharicus Iljin – Central Asia
 Asparagus burchellii Baker – Cape Province
 Asparagus burjaticus Peschkova – S. Siberia to N. Mongolia
 Asparagus calcicola H.Perrier – S.W. Madagascar
 Asparagus capensis L. – Namibia to Cape Province
 Asparagus capitatus Baker – N. Oman, E. Afghanistan to W. Himalaya
 Asparagus chimanimanensis Sebsebe – S. Tropical Africa (Chimanimani Mts)
 Asparagus clareae (Oberm.) Fellingham & N.L.Mey. – Northern Province
 Asparagus cochinchinensis (Lour.) Merr. – Japan to Indo-China and Philippines (N. Luzon)
 Asparagus coddii (Oberm.) Fellingham & N.L.Mey. – KwaZulu-Natal
 Asparagus concinnus (Baker) Kies – S. Africa
 Asparagus confertus K.Krause – W. Cape Province
 Asparagus coodei P.H.Davis – Turkey (Içel, Konya)
 Asparagus crassicladus Jessop – Cape Province
 Asparagus curillus Buch.-Ham. ex Roxb. – W. Central & Central Himalaya to India (Punjab)
 Asparagus dauricus Fisch. ex Link – Siberia to N.E. Korea
 Asparagus declinatus L. – Namibia to W. Cape Province, Madagascar
 Asparagus deflexus Baker – Angola
 Asparagus densiflorus (Kunth) Jessop – Mozambique (Inhaca Islands) to S. Africa
 Asparagus denudatus (Kunth) Baker – E. Tropical & S. Africa
 Asparagus devenishii (Oberm.) Fellingham & N.L.Mey. – S. Africa
 Asparagus divaricatus (Oberm.) Fellingham & N.L.Mey. – E .Zimbabwe to S. Africa
 Asparagus drepanophyllus Welw. ex Baker – W. Central Tropical Africa to Angola
 Asparagus duchesnei L.Linden – Zaïre
 Asparagus dumosus Baker – Pakistan to N.W. India
 Asparagus edulis (Oberm.) J.-P.Lebrun & Stork – Zimbabwe to S. Africa
 Asparagus elephantinus S.M.Burrows – Limpopo
 Asparagus equisetoides Welw. ex Baker – Angola
 Asparagus exsertus (Oberm.) Fellingham & N.L.Mey. – S.W. Cape Province
 Asparagus exuvialis Burch. – S. Tropical & S. Africa
 Asparagus falcatus L. – S.W. Ethiopia to S. Africa, Arabian Peninsula, India, Sri Lanka
 Asparagus fallax Svent. – Canary Islands
 Asparagus fasciculatus Thunb. – Namibia to Free State, Madagascar
 Asparagus faulkneri Sebsebe – S.E. Kenya to Tanzania
 Asparagus ferganensis Vved. – Central Asia
 Asparagus filicinus Buch.-Ham. ex D.Don – Himalaya to Central China
 Asparagus filicladus (Oberm.) Fellingham & N.L.Mey. – Cape Province
 Asparagus filifolius Bertol. – Syria to Iraq
 Asparagus flagellaris (Kunth) Baker – Tropical & S. Africa, W. Arabian Peninsula
 Asparagus flavicaulis (Oberm.) Fellingham & N.L.Mey. – Zimbabwe to Northern Province
 Asparagus fouriei (Oberm.) Fellingham & N.L.Mey. – Limpopo
 Asparagus fractiflexus (Oberm.) Fellingham & N.L.Mey. – Northern Province to KwaZulu-Natal
 Asparagus fysonii J.F.Macbr. – S. India
 Asparagus gharoensis Blatt. – S. Pakistan
 Asparagus glaucus Kies – S. Africa
 Asparagus gobicus N.A.Ivanova ex Grubov – Mongolia to N. China
 Asparagus gonoclados Baker – S. India, Sri Lanka
 Asparagus graniticus (Oberm.) Fellingham & N.L.Mey. – Namibia to W. Cape Province
 Asparagus greveanus H.Perrier – W. & S.W. Madagascar
 Asparagus griffithii Baker – Iran to W. Himalaya
 Asparagus gypsaceus Vved. – Central Asia (Pamir Mts.)
 Asparagus hajrae Kamble – Assam
 Asparagus hirsutus S.M.Burrows – Limpopo
 Asparagus homblei De Wild. – Zaïre
 Asparagus horridus L. – Canary Islands, Mediterranean to Arabian Peninsula
 Asparagus humilis Engl. – S.E. Kenya to Mozambique
 Asparagus inderiensis Blume ex Ledeb. – Crimea to Central Asia
 Asparagus intricatus (Oberm.) Fellingham & N.L.Mey. – S. Africa
 Asparagus juniperoides Engl. – S.W. Namibia to N.W. Cape Province
 Asparagus kaessneri De Wild. – Zaïre
 Asparagus kansuensis F.T.Wang & Tang ex S.C.Chen – China (S. Gansu)
 Asparagus karthikeyanii (Kamble) M.R.Almeida – India (Maharashtra)
 Asparagus katangensis De Wild. & T.Durand – S. Zaïre
 Asparagus khorasanensis Hamdi & Assadi – Iran
 Asparagus kiusianus Makino – Japan (Kyushu)
 Asparagus kraussianus (Kunth) J.F.Macbr. – S.W. Cape Province
 Asparagus krebsianus (Kunth) Jessop – Central & S. Malawi to Cape Province
 Asparagus laevissimus Steud. ex Baker – S. India
 Asparagus laricinus Burch. – Congo to Tanzania and S. Africa
 Asparagus lecardii De Wild. – Zaïre
 Asparagus ledebourii Miscz. – E. Caucasus
 Asparagus leptocladodius Chiov. – S. Ethiopia to Djibouti and Kenya
 Asparagus lignosus Burm.f. – S.W. Cape Province
 Asparagus litoralis Steven - England, Ukraine, Russia, Bulgaria, and Turkey 
 Asparagus longicladus N.E.Br. – Zimbabwe to Botswana
 Asparagus longiflorus Franch. – Qinghai to N. Central China
 Asparagus longipes Baker – Cameroon
 Asparagus lycaonicus P.H.Davis – Turkey (Konya), Iran (Arak salt lake)
 Asparagus lycicus P.H.Davis – Turkey (Antalya)
 Asparagus lycopodineus (Baker) F.T.Wang & Tang – Bhutan to Central China
 Asparagus lynetteae (Oberm.) Fellingham & N.L.Mey. – Mpumalanga
 Asparagus macowanii Baker – Mozambique to S. Africa
 Asparagus madecassus H.Perrier – Madagascar
 Asparagus mahafalensis H.Perrier – S.W. Madagascar
 Asparagus mairei H.Lév. – China (Yunnan)
 Asparagus mariae (Oberm.) Fellingham & N.L.Mey. – Cape Province
 Asparagus maritimus (L.) Mill. – S. Europe to Crimea
 Asparagus meioclados H.Lév. – S. Central China
 Asparagus merkeri K.Krause – Tanzania
 Asparagus microraphis (Kunth) Baker – S. Africa
 Asparagus migeodii Sebsebe – S. Tanzania to S. Tropical Africa
 Asparagus minutiflorus (Kunth) Baker – Mozambique to S. Africa
 Asparagus mollis (Oberm.) Fellingham & N.L.Mey. – W. Cape Province
 Asparagus monophyllus Baker – Afghanistan to W. Pakistan
 Asparagus mozambicus Kunth – Mozambique (I. Quirimba)
 Asparagus mucronatus Jessop – Cape Province
 Asparagus multituberosus R.A.Dyer – W. Cape Province
 Asparagus munitus F.T.Wang & S.C.Chen – S. Central China
 Asparagus myriacanthus F.T.Wang & S.C.Chen – S.E. Tibet to China (N.W. Yunnan)
 Asparagus natalensis (Baker) J.-P.Lebrun & Stork – Ethiopia to S. Africa
 Asparagus neglectus Kar. & Kir. – Siberia to W. Himalaya
 Asparagus nelsii Schinz – Zambia to S. Africa
 Asparagus nesiotes Svent. – Selvagens, Canary Islands
 Asparagus nodulosus (Oberm.) J.-P.Lebrun & Stork – Zimbabwe to S. Africa
 Asparagus officinalis L. – Europe to Mongolia, N.W. Africa
 Asparagus oligoclonos Maxim. – Mongolia to Japan
 Asparagus oliveri (Oberm.) Fellingham & N.L.Mey. – S. Tropical Africa to Botswana
 Asparagus ovatus T.M.Salter – S.W. & S. Cape Province
 Asparagus oxyacanthus Baker – E. Cape Province
 Asparagus pachyrrhizus – Central Asia
 Asparagus palaestinus Baker – Israel (Jordan Valley), Turkey
 Asparagus pallasii Miscz. – E. Romania to Siberia
 Asparagus pastorianus Webb & Berthel. – Canary Islands, W. Morocco
 Asparagus pearsonii Kies – Namibia to W. Cape Province
 Asparagus pendulus (Oberm.) J.-P.Lebrun & Stork – S. Tropical Africa to Botswana
 Asparagus penicillatus H.Hara – W. Nepal
 Asparagus persicus Baker – Central Turkey to Mongolia and W. Pakistan
 Asparagus petersianus Kunth – Tanzania to Mozambique
 Asparagus plocamoides Webb ex Svent. – Canary Islands
 Asparagus poissonii H.Perrier – S.W. Madagascar
 Asparagus prostratus Dumort. – Coasts of W. Europe
 Asparagus przewalskyi N.A.Ivanova ex Grubov & T.V.Egorova – Qinghai
 Asparagus pseudoscaber Grecescu – S.E. Europe to Ukraine
 Asparagus psilurus Welw. ex Baker – S. Tropical & S. Africa
 Asparagus punjabensis J.L.Stewart – India
 Asparagus pygmaeus Makino – Japan
 Asparagus racemosus Willd. – Tropical Africa to N. Australia
 Asparagus radiatus Sebsebe – S. Mozambique to Swaziland (Umbeluzi Gorge)
 Asparagus ramosissimus Baker – S. Africa
 Asparagus recurvispinus (Oberm.) Fellingham & N.L.Mey. – Cape Province
 Asparagus retrofractus L. – Namibia to Cape Province
 Asparagus richardsiae Sebsebe – Zambia
 Asparagus rigidus Jessop – Northern Province
 Asparagus ritschardii De Wild. – Zaïre
 Asparagus rogersii R.E.Fr. – Kenya to Zambia
 Asparagus rottleri Baker – S. India
 Asparagus rubicundus P.J.Bergius – Cape Province
 Asparagus rubricaulis (Kunth) Baker – India
 Asparagus sapinii De Wild. – Zaïre
 Asparagus sarmentosus L. – India
 Asparagus saundersiae Baker – Malawi, S. Africa
 Asparagus scaberulus A.Rich. – N.E. & E. Tropical Africa
 Asparagus scandens Thunb. – S.W. & S. Cape Province
 Asparagus schoberioides Kunth – S.E. Siberia to Japan
 Asparagus schroederi Engl. – Tropical & S. Africa
 Asparagus schumanianus Schltr. ex H.Perrier – S.W. Madagascar
 Asparagus scoparius Lowe – Macaronesia
 Asparagus sekukuniensis (Oberm.) Fellingham & N.L.Mey. – Northern Province
 Asparagus setaceus (Kunth) Jessop – Central Ethiopia to S. Africa, Comoros
 Asparagus sichuanicus S.C.Chen & D.Q.Liu – Tibet to China (Sichuan)
 Asparagus simulans Baker – Madagascar
 Asparagus spinescens Steud. ex Schult. & Schult.f. – E. Cape Province
 Asparagus squarrosus J.A.Schmidt – Cape Verde
 Asparagus stachyphyllus H.Lév. & Vaniot – Korea
 Asparagus stellatus Baker – E. Cape Province to Lesotho
 Asparagus stipulaceus Lam. – S.W. Cape Province
 Asparagus striatus (L.f.) Thunb. – Cape Province to Free State
 Asparagus suaveolens Burch. – Kenya to S. Africa
 Asparagus subfalcatus De Wild. – Zaïre
 Asparagus subscandens F.T.Wang & S.C.Chen – China (S. Yunnan)
 Asparagus subulatus Thunb. – E. Cape Province
 Asparagus sylvicola S.M.Burrows – Northern Province to Swaziland
 Asparagus taliensis F.T.Wang & Tang ex S.C.Chen – China (Yunnan)
 Asparagus tamariscinus N.A.Ivanova ex Grubov – Central Asia to S. Siberia and Mongolia
 Asparagus tenuifolius Lam. – Mediterranean to Ukraine
 Asparagus tibeticus F.T.Wang & S.C.Chen – Tibet
 Asparagus transvaalensis (Oberm.) Fellingham & N.L.Mey. – Northern Province to Swaziland
 Asparagus trichoclados (F.T.Wang & Tang) F.T.Wang & S.C.Chen – China (Central Yunnan)
 Asparagus trichophyllus Bunge – W. Asia, Mongolia to N. China
 Asparagus turkestanicus Popov – Central Asia
 Asparagus uhligii K.Krause – Tanzania
 Asparagus umbellatus Link – Macaronesia
 Asparagus umbellulatus Bresler – Seychelles to Mascarenes
 Asparagus undulatus (L.f.) Thunb. – Namibia to W. Cape Province
 Asparagus usambarensis Sebsebe – Tanzania (Usambara Mts.)
 Asparagus vaginellatus Bojer ex Baker – Madagascar
 Asparagus verticillatus L. – S.E. Europe to Iran
 Asparagus virgatus Baker – Yemen, S. Tanzania to S. Africa
 Asparagus volubilis (L.f.) Thunb. – Cape Province
 Asparagus vvedenskyi Botsch. – Central Asia
 Asparagus warneckei (Engl.) Hutch. – W. & W. Central Tropical Africa
 Asparagus yanbianensis S.C.Chen – China (S.W. Sichuan)
 Asparagus yanyuanensis S.C.Chen – China (S.W. Sichuan)

References

Asparagus